A signpost is an erected sign.

The Signpost, Signpost or Sign Post may also refer to:

Media and literature 
 The Signpost, online newspaper of the English Wikipedia since January 2005
The Signpost (novel), a 1944 novel by E. Arnot Robertson
The Signpost (Weber State University), a student newspaper

Other uses 
 Signpost (company), an American marketing automation company
 Sign Post, Virginia, an unincorporated community